Stage to Mesa City is a 1947 American Western film directed by Ray Taylor and starring Lash La Rue, Al St. John, Jennifer Holt, George Chesebro, Buster Slaven, and Marshall Reed. The film was released by Producers Releasing Corporation on September 13, 1947.

Plot

Cast
Lash La Rue as Cheyenne Davis (as 'Lash' La Rue)
Al St. John as Fuzzy Jones (as Al 'Fuzzy' St. John)
Jennifer Holt as Margie Watson
George Chesebro as Tom Padgett
Buster Slaven as Bob Watson (as Brad Slaven)
Marshall Reed as Lawyer Baxter
Terry Frost as Henchman Ed Williams
Carl Mathews as Henchman Jim
Bob Woodward as Stage Driver Pete
Steve Clark as John Watson
Frank Ellis as Stocker
Lee Morgan as Sheriff
Russell Arms as Postal Inspector Hardy (uncredited)
Roy Bucko as Henchman (uncredited)
Dee Cooper as Henchman (uncredited)
Rube Dalroy as Townsman (uncredited)
Jack Evans as Townsman (uncredited)
Kit Guard as Barfly (uncredited)
Herman Hack as Townsman (uncredited)
George Huggins as Townsman (uncredited)
Wally West as Henchman (uncredited)

References

External links

1947 Western (genre) films
American Western (genre) films
1947 films
American black-and-white films
Producers Releasing Corporation films
Films with screenplays by Joseph F. Poland
Films directed by Ray Taylor
1940s American films